Lois Lorraine Felix-Spencer (June 1, 1927  – December 23, 2001) was an American amateur tennis player in the 1950s and 1960s. At one time in her career, she was ranked  No. 8 in the U.S. singles rankings.

At the U.S. Indoor Championships, Felix won the singles title in 1959 and in 1960 was a singles and doubles finalist.

At the tournament in Cincinnati, Felix won the singles and doubles titles in 1957, and won the singles title in 1954.  She won the 1957 doubles title with Margareta Bonstrom of Sweden.

She was inducted into the New England Tennis Hall of Fame in 1990.

References

 "From Club Court to Center Court" by Phillip S. Smith (2008 Edition; ISBN 978-0-9712445-7-3)

External links
 Meriden Hall of Fame

American female tennis players
People from Meriden, Connecticut
Tennis people from Connecticut
1927 births
2001 deaths
20th-century American women
20th-century American people